WGKB (1510 AM) is a radio station licensed to Waukesha, Wisconsin and serving the Milwaukee area.

The station is owned by Good Karma Brands, through licensee Good Karma Broadcasting, LLC. WGKB has an FM translator W269DL (101.7 MHz), which transmits from the WITI TV Tower in Shorewood, and currently broadcasts a talk radio format aimed towards Milwaukee's Black community.

History
The 1510 AM frequency originally signed on as WAUX and later was the original home of the WAUK call sign until February 12, 2008. They had been a sports talk station since October 1994 and the previous home of ESPN Radio. Prior to sports the station had a smorgasbord of formats, including variations of adult contemporary, country music, and talk. WAUK was also the original sister station of Waukesha-licensed WMIL-FM (106.1), which launched as WAUX-FM and later became WAUK-FM before a sale to another party in the late 1970s.

WGKB is limited to operating between sunrise and sunset, as WLAC in Nashville, Tennessee is classed as a clear-channel station. As a result, the station leased time from WMCS to carry the full ESPN Radio schedule between 6:00 p.m. and 6:00 a.m. for several years.

That arrangement ended after Good Karma Broadcasting moved the WAUK sports format to its new, full-time frequency of 540 kHz, the former home of Salem Broadcasting religious outlet WRRD. The WRRD calls then migrated to the 1510 kHz frequency.

On May 2, 2008, WRRD switched from English-language sports radio to be an affiliate of ESPN Deportes, a new Spanish-language sports talk and play-by-play network.

On January 31, 2017, The Devil's Advocates Radio announced plans to purchase WRRD and to change the format to progressive talk, branded as "News Talk 1510" and as "WRRD Resistance Radio". The format change was implemented February 1 of that year.

Good Karma Broadcasting sold WRRD to New WRRD, LLC effective June 1, 2017 for $760,000. On November 13, 2019, WRRD rebranded as "Talk 101.7" with the sign-on of W269DL 101.7 FM, which also allows the station to carry a full-day schedule, even after sunset. WRRD applied for a downgrade to 250 watts non-directional on August 19, 2020, shortly after putting the dormant Waukesha studio facility and transmitter site up for sale. The station dropped most local programming in August 2020, resulting in a near-simulcast of sister station WTTN.

On August 31, 2020, WRRD reverted to sports as a simulcast of former sister station WAUK, and the station's social media presence referred listeners to WTTN and its streaming presences with the shuttering of Crute's main studio facility on Brady Street in Milwaukee. On September 4, Good Karma Brands announced the acquisition of the W269DL translator, along with the re-acquisition of WRRD as former owner Michael Crute negotiated with Good Karma to trade the stations, while strengthening its Madison presence.

On September 29, 2020, Good Karma announced that WRRD would become a talk radio station focused on the city's Black community, branded as "101.7 The Truth", with W269DL continuing to utilize 1510 as a signal source. It is the first full-time Black talk station in the market in seven years, after WNOV converted to a music-heavy format under new ownership, while former network-share partner WMCS (now WZTI) converted to suburban-focused oldies formats after acquiring an FM translator. The station is also meant as a local response to iHeartMedia's Black Information Network, which has not yet launched in Milwaukee. Its call sign was changed to WGKB on December 2, 2020. The new format launched on January 4, 2021, utilizing a live 7 a.m.–6 p.m. schedule of four programs that repeats overnight, albeit exclusively over W269DL after WGKB's dusk sign-off.

The acquisition of WGKB and translator W269DL was consummated on April 30, 2021.

Previous logo

References

External links

Milwaukee radio: a retrospective

GKB
Radio stations established in 1947
1947 establishments in Wisconsin
GKB